Pedro Suarez de Escobar,  O.S.A. (died 1591) was a Roman Catholic prelate who served as Bishop elect of Guadalajara (1591).

Biography
Pedro Suarez de Escobar was born in Medellin, Badajoz and ordained a priest in the Order of Saint Augustine.
In 1591, he was appointed during the papacy of Pope Gregory XIV as Bishop of Guadalajara.
He died before he was consecrated in the same year.

References

External links and additional sources
 (for Chronology of Bishops)
 (for Chronology of Bishops)

16th-century Roman Catholic bishops in Mexico
Bishops appointed by Pope Gregory XIV
1591 deaths
People from Medellín
Augustinian bishops